The Linguistic Review is a double-blind peer-reviewed academic journal covering linguistics established in 1981 and published by Walter de Gruyter. The editor-in-chief is Harry van der Hulst (University of Connecticut).

Aims and scope
The journal is mostly concerned with syntax (from the point of view of generative grammar), morphology, semantics and phonology. Apart from research papers, the journal also publishes reviews, dissertation abstracts and letters to the editor.

Occasionally, special thematic issues appear, aimed at a critique of currently debated topics and theories.

References

External links 
 

Linguistics journals
English-language journals
Publications with year of establishment missing
Quarterly journals
Publications established in 1981
De Gruyter academic journals